The 2005–06 NCAA Division I men's basketball season began on November 6, 2005, progressed through the regular season and conference tournaments and concluded with the 2006 NCAA Division I men's basketball tournament championship game on April 3, 2006, at the RCA Dome in Indianapolis, Indiana. The Florida Gators won their first NCAA national championship with a 73–56 victory over the UCLA Bruins. This was the final Final Four site at the RCA Dome. The Final Four will return to the city of Indianapolis, but will be held at Lucas Oil Stadium.

Season headlines 

 Florida won its first national title in basketball, defeating UCLA in the championship game 73–57. The team was led by a group of sophomores, several of whom were the offspring of retired professional athletes, nicknamed "The Oh-fours." Forward Al Horford and guard Taurean Green were the sons of former NBA players (Tito Horford and Sidney Green respectively), while center and Final Four MOP Joakim Noah was the son of retired tennis pro Yannick Noah. These three (along with fellow sophomore star Corey Brewer) surprised many by choosing not to enter the NBA draft, but instead returning to try to repeat as champions in 2006–07.
 George Mason made an improbable run to the Final Four, becoming the first true mid-major to do so since Penn in 1979. The Patriots’ path was not easy, as they defeated schools that had won three of the past six titles – national powers Michigan State, North Carolina and Connecticut – en route to its first Final Four berth.
 JJ Redick of Duke and Adam Morrison of Gonzaga engaged in a year-long battle for the National scoring title and Player of the Year honors. Morrison won the scoring race, edging Redick by 1.3 points per game. However, Redick won most National POY Awards, though he and Morrison were the first co-winners of the 2006 Oscar Robertson Trophy.
 Paul Millsap of Louisiana Tech became the first player ever to lead the Nation in rebounding for three consecutive years.
 A major realignment of teams in the Big East and ACC sent shock waves across college basketball. Boston College followed Virginia Tech and Miami (who had moved the year before) from the Big East to the ACC. The Big East brought in five teams from Conference USA – Cincinnati, DePaul, Louisville, Marquette and South Florida.
 To replace the teams that defected to the Big East (as well as TCU, who left C-USA for the Mountain West Conference and Charlotte and Saint Louis, who left for the Atlantic 10), Conference USA brought in six new members: Rice, SMU, Tulsa and UTEP from the Western Athletic Conference; Marshall from the Mid-American Conference and Central Florida from the Atlantic Sun Conference.
 Other conference realignments effective this season: The WAC added New Mexico State (from the Sun Belt Conference), Idaho and Utah State (both from the Big West Conference). East Tennessee State moved from the Southern Conference to the Atlantic Sun. The Colonial Athletic Association added Northeastern from the America East Conference and Georgia State from the Atlantic Sun. Troy moved from the Atlantic Sun to the Sun Belt Conference.
 The preseason AP All-American team was named on November 8. JJ Redick of Duke was the leading vote-getter (67 of 72 votes). The rest of the team included Shelden Williams of Duke (63 votes), Dee Brown of Illinois (51), Adam Morrison of Gonzaga (45) and Craig Smith of Boston College (31).

Season outlook

Pre-season polls 
The top 25 from the AP and ESPN/USA Today Coaches Polls November 7, 2005.

Conference membership changes 

These schools joined new conferences for the 2005–06 season.

Regular season

Conference winners and tournaments 

Thirty conference seasons conclude with a single-elimination tournament. Traditionally, all conference schools are eligible, regardless of record. However, some conferences, most notably the Big East, do not invite the teams with the worst records. The conference tournament winner receives an automatic bid to the NCAA Tournament. A school that wins the conference regular season title is guaranteed an NIT bid; however, it may receive an at-large bid to the NCAA Tournament.

Statistical leaders

Conference standings

Post-season tournaments

NCAA tournament 

The NCAA Tournament tipped off on March 14, 2006 with the opening round game in Dayton, Ohio, and concluded on April 3 at the RCA Dome in Indianapolis, Indiana. A total of 65 teams entered the tournament. Thirty of the teams earned automatic bids by winning their conference tournaments. The automatic bid of the Ivy League, which does not conduct a post-season tournament, went to its regular season champion. The remaining 34 teams were granted "at-large" bids, which are extended by the NCAA Selection Committee. The Big East Conference led the way with eight bids. Florida won their first NCAA title, beating UCLA 73–56 in the final. Florida forward Joakim Noah was named the tournament's Most Outstanding Player.

Final Four – RCA Dome, Indianapolis, Indiana 

 A-Atlanta, O-Oakland, W-Washington, D.C., M-Minneapolis.

National Invitation tournament 

After the NCAA Tournament field was announced, the National Invitation Tournament invited 32 teams to participate, reducing the field's size from 40. Eight teams were given automatic bids for winning their conference regular seasons, and 24 other teams were also invited. Dave Odom's South Carolina Gamecocks won their second consecutive title, defeating the Tommy Amaker-coached Michigan Wolverines 76–64 in the championship game. Gamecock forward Renaldo Balkman was named tournament MVP.

Semifinals & finals

Award winners

Consensus All-American teams

Major player of the year awards 
 Wooden Award: JJ Redick, Duke
 Naismith Award: JJ Redick, Duke
 Associated Press Player of the Year: JJ Redick, Duke
 NABC Player of the Year: JJ Redick, Duke and Adam Morrison, Gonzaga
 Oscar Robertson Trophy (USBWA): JJ Redick, Duke and Adam Morrison, Gonzaga
 Adolph Rupp Trophy: JJ Redick, Duke
 CBS/Chevrolet Player of the Year: JJ Redick, Duke
 Sporting News Player of the Year: JJ Redick, Duke

Major freshman of the year awards 
 USBWA Freshman of the Year: Tyler Hansbrough, North Carolina
 Sporting News Freshman of the Year: Tyler Hansbrough, North Carolina

Major coach of the year awards 
 Associated Press Coach of the Year: Jay Wright, Villanova
 Henry Iba Award (USBWA): Roy Williams, North Carolina
 NABC Coach of the Year: Jay Wright, Villanova
 Naismith College Coach of the Year: Jay Wright, Villanova
 CBS/Chevrolet Coach of the Year: Jay Wright, Villanova
 Adolph Rupp Cup: Roy Williams, North Carolina
 Sporting News Coach of the Year: Bruce Pearl, Tennessee

Other major awards 
 Bob Cousy Award (Best point guard): Dee Brown, Illinois
 Pete Newell Big Man Award (Best big man): Glen Davis, LSU
 NABC Defensive Player of the Year: Shelden Williams, Duke
 Frances Pomeroy Naismith Award (Best player under 6'0): Dee Brown, Illinois
 Lowe's Senior CLASS Award (top senior): JJ Redick, Duke
 Robert V. Geasey Trophy (Top player in Philadelphia Big 5): Randy Foye, Villanova
 NIT/Haggerty Award (Top player in New York City metro area): Quincy Douby, Rutgers
 Chip Hilton Player of the Year Award (Strong personal character): Gerry McNamara, Syracuse

Coaching changes 
A number of teams changed coaches throughout the season and after the season ended.

References